Dolichosuchus (meaning "long crocodile") is the name given to a genus of dinosaur from the Triassic. It was originally classified in the disused family Hallopodidae, but has since been reclassified as a coelophysoid. A single fossil (consisting of a single lower leg bone, or tibia) was found in Germany. Since only one bone was discovered, the genus is considered a nomen dubium. Some scientists have noted that the tibia closely resembles those of Liliensternus and Dilophosaurus.

The type species is D. cristatus, described by Huene in 1932. The bone was recovered from the Lower or Middle Stubensandstein formation.

References 

Coelophysoids
Late Triassic dinosaurs of Europe
Norian life
Triassic Germany
Fossils of Germany
Fossil taxa described in 1932
Taxa named by Friedrich von Huene
Nomina dubia